Esapekka Lappi (born 17 January 1991) is a Finnish rally driver. He is the 2012 Finnish Rally Champion, 2014 European Rally Champion and the 2016 WRC-2 Champion.

Career

2012
Lappi won the 2012 Finnish Rally Championship with Ford Fiesta S2000 winning all the 7 rounds of the championship with his co-driver Janne Ferm.

In October, Lappi was signed by Škoda Motorsport. Lappi won his first rally with the team in 2012 Rally Poland which was part of European Rally Championship, driving a Škoda Fabia S2000.

Škoda Motorsport (2013–2016)

In 2013, Lappi competed full season in Asia-Pacific Rally Championship with Team MRF's Škoda Fabia S2000, and selected events in both WRC-2 and ERC with Škoda Motorsport. In APRC, Lappi won three out of six events and finished the season runner-up to his team-mate Gaurav Gill.

In ERC, Lappi competed in three tarmac rallies, winning the last of them Rallye International du Valais in Switzerland. He finished the season fifth in the final standings.

In WRC-2, he also raced in three rallies, winning Rally de Portugal where he also scored his maiden WRC-point finishing 10th overall.

Lappi won the 2014 European Rally Championship title with victories in Latvia, Northern Ireland and Switzerland.

Lappi continued competing with Škoda Motorsport driving their new challenger Fabia R5 in WRC-2 championship. He scored two wins in Poland and Finland on his way to finish the season in third place behind Nasser Al-Attiyah and Yuriy Protasov. Lappi also scored his career-best WRC result finishing eighth in Rally Finland.

He won the 2016 World Rally Championship-2 with the Škoda Fabia R5 after winning in Finland, Germany, Wales and Australia.

Toyota (2017–2018)

Lappi was signed by Toyota Gazoo Racing to drive a Toyota Yaris WRC in the 2017 World Rally Championship.
On his second event with the team, the 2017 Rally d'Italia, he won his first ever stage in the WRC, along with five more stage wins. He eventually finished fourth. In just his fourth World Rally Car start, at his home event of Rally Finland, Lappi took his first WRC victory. In October 2018, Toyota announced that Lappi would leave the team at the end of the 2018 championship.

Citroën (2019)
He joined Citroën for the 2019 season, partnering with multiple champion Sébastien Ogier. With the Citroën C3 WRC, Lappi finished the season in tenth place after a difficult year with many retirements. He scored three podiums for the French team, by finishing second in Sweden, Finland and Turkey. After the season, Citroën announced they would depart from the World Rally Championship in 2020 after Ogier moved to Lappi's old team, Toyota, leaving Lappi to find a seat elsewhere.

M-Sport (2020)

After Citroën's exit in 2019, Lappi signed for M-Sport to drive the whole season in a Ford Fiesta WRC alongside his compatriot Teemu Suninen.

Movisport and RTE-Motorsport WRC 2 (2021) 
In 2021, Lappi drove a Volkswagen Polo GTI for Movistar (rounds 2, 4) and a Toyota Yaris WRC for RTE-Motorsport (round 10) in the WRC 2 championship alongside longtime co-driver Janne Ferm. Of the three rounds he entered, Lappi won two and finished fourth in the third, ending the season in 12th place on points.

Toyota (2022) 
Lappi returned to Toyota Gazoo Racing for the 2022 season in the new hybrid Toyota GR Yaris Rally1, joining drivers Kalle Rovanperä, Elfyn Evans, and Takamoto Katsuta. With co-driver Janne Ferm, Lappi shares the third Toyota car with Sébastien Ogier and his co-driver Benjamin Veillas.

WRC victories

Career results

WRC results
 
* Season still in progress.

SWRC results

WRC-2 results

* Season still in progress.

ERC results

APRC results

Personal life
Lappi is gluten intolerant. The Citroën service park chef prepares gluten-free dishes for him. One of his sponsors is Moilas, a Finnish producer of gluten-free foods.

References

External links

 Official website
 Lappi's profile in ewrc-results.com

Living people
1991 births
Finnish rally drivers
World Rally Championship drivers
European Rally Championship drivers
People from Pieksämäki
Sportspeople from South Savo
Citroën Racing drivers
Toyota Gazoo Racing drivers
Hyundai Motorsport drivers
M-Sport drivers
Škoda Motorsport drivers